Fantastic Beasts and Where to Find Them (often referred to as simply Fantastic Beasts) is a 2001 guide book written by British author J. K. Rowling (under the pen name of the fictitious author Newt Scamander) about the magical creatures in the Harry Potter universe. The original version, illustrated by the author herself, purports to be Harry Potter's copy of the textbook of the same name mentioned in Harry Potter and the Philosopher's Stone (or Harry Potter and the Sorcerer's Stone in the US), the first novel of the Harry Potter series. It includes several notes inside it supposedly handwritten by Harry, Ron Weasley, and Hermione Granger, detailing their own experiences with some of the beasts described, and including inside jokes relating to the original series.

In a 2001 interview with publisher Scholastic, Rowling stated that she chose the subject of magical creatures because it was a fun topic for which she had already developed much information in earlier books. Rowling's name did not appear on the cover of the first edition, the work being credited under the pen name "Newt Scamander", who, in the books, wrote this textbook as seen on Harry's supply list for his first year.

The book benefits the BBC affiliated charity Comic Relief. Over 80% of the cover price of each book sold goes directly to poor children in various places around the world. According to Comic Relief, sales from this book and its companion Quidditch Through the Ages had raised over £17 million by July 2009.

On 12 September 2013, Warner Bros. and Rowling announced they would be producing a film inspired by the book, being the first in a series of five such films. Rowling herself was the screenwriter. She came up with a plan for a movie after Warner Bros. suggested the idea. The story features Newt Scamander as a main character and is set in New York City, 70 years before Harry's story started. The film was released on 18 November 2016.

On 14 March 2017 a new edition of the book, with cover illustrations by Jonny Duddle and interior illustrations by Tomislav Tomic, was published with six new creatures and a foreword by Newt Scamander. It is assumed to be a new copy as it does not feature any handwritten notes. Proceeds from this edition are donated to Lumos as well as Comic Relief.

On 1 February 2018 a Kindle in Motion edition, featuring these illustrations with movement, was released for compatible devices.

Synopsis

Original "for Muggles" version
Fantastic Beasts purports to be a reproduction of a textbook owned by Harry Potter and written by magizoologist Newt Scamander, a character in the fictional Harry Potter series. In the series, magizoology is the study of magical creatures.

Albus Dumbledore, headmaster of Hogwarts, provides the foreword and explains the purpose of the special edition of this book (the Comic Relief charity). At the end, he assures muggle readers, "The amusing creatures described hereafter are fictional and cannot hurt you." He repeats the Hogwarts motto: "Draco dormiens nunquam titillandus", Latin for "Never tickle a sleeping dragon".

Fantastic Beasts and Where to Find Them contains the history of magizoology and describes 85 magical species found around the world. Scamander says that he collected most of the information found in the book through observations made over years of travel across five continents. He notes that the first edition was commissioned in 1918 by Augustus Worme of Obscurus Books. However, it was not published until 1927. It is now in its fifty-second edition.

In the Harry Potter universe, the book is a required textbook for first-year Hogwarts students, having been an approved textbook since its first publication. In his foreword to the book, Albus Dumbledore notes that it serves as an excellent reference for wizarding households in addition to its use at Hogwarts.

The book features doodles and comments added by Harry Potter and Ron Weasley, who apparently shares the book with Harry "because his fell apart". The comments would appear to have been written around the time of the fourth book, Harry Potter and the Goblet of Fire. These doodles add some extra information for fans of the series (for example the "Acromantula" entry has a comment confirming that Hogwarts is located in Scotland) along with comic relief (such as Harry stating "you're not kidding" when talking about the Hungarian Horntail being the most fearsome dragon of all, a reference to Harry's encounter with one in the fourth book).

The cover design of the first edition of the book features apparent claw marks from an unidentified animal.

2017 "for Wizards" version
This edition features six new creatures: the hidebehind, the hodag, the horned serpent, the snallygaster, the thunderbird, and the wampus cat, in addition to the original 75, and the illustrations are replaced. Newt Scamander, in the foreword, explains the reason the six new creatures were not previously included is because MACUSA president Seraphina Picquery requested the more important American creatures not be mentioned to deter wizarding sightseers at a time when the US wizarding community were subject to greater persecution than their European counterparts, and after Scamander had contributed to a serious breach of the International Statute of Secrecy in New York.

Role in the Harry Potter series
The book's fictional author, Newt Scamander, does not appear in the main Harry Potter book series.

However, his name is seen on the Marauder's Map in Harry Potter and the Prisoner of Azkaban film. He is the central character of the Fantastic Beasts film series, in which he is played by Eddie Redmayne.

Featured beasts

The following mythological beasts are listed in the book:

 Acromantula
 Ashwinder
 Augurey
 Basilisk
 Billywig
 Bowtruckle
 Bundimun
 Centaur
 Chimaera
 Chizpurfle
 Clabbert
 Crup
 Demiguise
 Diricawl
 Doxy
 Dragon
 Antipodean Opaleye
 Chinese Fireball
 Common Welsh Green
 Hebridean Black
 Hungarian Horntail
 Norwegian Ridgeback
 Peruvian Vipertooth
 Romanian Longhorn
 Swedish Short-Snout
 Ukrainian Ironbelly
 Dugbog
 Erkling
 Erumpent
 Fairy
 Fire Crab
 Flobberworm
 Fwooper
 Ghoul
 Glumbumble
 Gnome
 Graphorn
 Griffin
 Grindylow
 Hidebehind
 Hippocampus
 Hippogriff
 Hodag
 Horklump
 Horned serpent
 Imp
 Jarvey
 Jobberknoll
 Kappa
 Kelpie
 Knarl
 Kneazle
 Leprechaun
 Lethifold
 Lobalug
 Mackled Malaclaw
 Manticore
 Merpeople
 Moke
 Mooncalf
 Murtlap
 Niffler
 Nogtail
 Nundu
 Occamy
 Phoenix
 Pixie
 Plimpy
 Pogrebin
 Porlock
 Puffskein
 Quintaped
 Ramora
 Red Cap
 Re'em
 Runespoor
 Salamander
 Sea serpent
 Shrake
 Snallygaster
 Snidget
 Sphinx
 Streeler
 Tebo
 Thunderbird
 Troll
 Unicorn
 Wampus cat
 Werewolf
 Winged horse
 Yeti

Editions
Scholastic editions
Paperback: 
Hardcover Box Set:  (Includes Fantastic Beasts... and Quidditch Through the Ages)
Paperback Box Set: 
Bloomsbury edition
2001 paperback: 
2009 paperback: 
2017 hardcover: 
Sagebrush Rebound edition
School & Library Edition: 
Pottermore E-book edition
Original version: 
2017 edition: 
2017 Olivia Lomenech Gill illustrated edition:

Reception
Jeff Jensen of Entertainment Weekly graded the book with an "A" and wrote "With its richly detailed history lessons and witty debate parsing the differences between being and beast, plus a compendium of 85 magical creatures that's chockablock with Rowling's trademark wordplay (Glumbumble is a standout), Beasts adds a vital new dimension to the Potter mythology."

Adaptations

Audiobook
The 2017 version of the book was recorded as an unabridged audiobook in 2017. The audiobook is read by Eddie Redmayne in the character of Newt Scamander.

In 2018, the American Library Association named it one of the Top Ten Amazing Audiobooks for Young Adults.

Film adaptations

Fantastic Beasts and Where to Find Them is a British-American fantasy film inspired by the book of the same name by J. K. Rowling. An extension of the wizarding world from the Harry Potter film series and directed by David Yates, the film stars Eddie Redmayne, Katherine Waterston, Alison Sudol, Dan Fogler, Samantha Morton, Ezra Miller, Colin Farrell, Carmen Ejogo, Faith Wood-Blagrove, Jenn Murray, Jon Voight and Ron Perlman. The first movie is set to be followed by four more. Principal photography commenced on 17 August 2015, at Warner Bros. Studios, Leavesden. Fantastic Beasts and Where to Find Them was released in the United Kingdom and the United States on 18 November 2016.

A sequel was released on 16 November 2018. The third movie was released on 15 April 2022 in the United Kingdom and 22 April 2022 in the United States.

Cultural adaptations
Fantastic Beasts - The Wonder of Nature was an exhibition at the Natural History Museum, London. The exhibition, which ran between 2020 and 2021, is a collaboration between the museum, Warner Bros. and The BBC Studios Natural History Unit The exhibition is a 'hybrid show' which uses digital interactive installations as well as specimens from the Natural History Museum collection.
The show was also featured on Google Arts and Culture as an online exhibition.
The exhibition was forced to close its doors a day after opening after London was put on tighter Covid-19 restriction. The museum promoted the online exhibit via its social media and website.

References

Further reading
Newt Scamander. Fantastic Beasts & Where to Find Them. New York, NY: Arthur A. Levine Books, 2001. Print.

External links

Interview with J. K. Rowling about her book Fantastic Beasts and Where to Find Them

2001 children's books
Bestiaries
Books by J. K. Rowling
Children's books adapted into films
Comic Relief
Encyclopedias of fictional worlds
Fantastic Beasts
Wizarding World books
Works published under a pseudonym
British works adapted into films